Honeymoon in Rio (Spanish: Luna de miel en Río) is a 1940 Argentine comedy film directed by Manuel Romero and starring Niní Marshall, Tito Lusiardo and Enrique Serrano.

The film's art direction was by Ricardo J. Conord.

Cast
 Niní Marshall as Catita  
 Tito Lusiardo as Gorostiaga  
 Enrique Serrano as Goyena  
 Juan Carlos Thorry as Emilio  
 Alicia Barrié as Cristina  
 Carmen del Moral as Susana  
 Enrique Roldán as Rosales 
 Zaira Cavalcanti as Mercedes

References

Bibliography 
 Rist, Peter H. Historical Dictionary of South American Cinema. Rowman & Littlefield, 2014.

External links 
 

1940 films
Argentine comedy films
1940 comedy films
1940s Spanish-language films
Films directed by Manuel Romero
Films set in Rio de Janeiro (city)
Argentine black-and-white films
1940s Argentine films